Patočka (feminine Patočková) is a Czech surname. It may refer to:

 Barbora Patočková (born 1998), Czech ice hockey player
 František Patočka (1904–1985), Czech physician, microbiologist, serologist
 František Patočka (sculptor) (1927–2002), Slovak sculptor (sk)
 Jan Patočka (1907–1977), Czech philosopher and dissident, a key figure in phenomenology and Charter 77
 Jürgen Patocka (born 1977), Austrian football player
 Libuše Patočková (1933–2010), Czech cross-country skier

See also 
Patoka

Czech-language surnames